The Nystrom Guest House, at 333 Ralston St. in Reno, Nevada, was built in 1875 as a "grand home" for Washoe County Clerk John
Shoemaker.  It includes Gothic Revival architecture.  Also known as the Shoemaker Home, it was listed on the National Register of Historic Places in 2000.

The house was reoriented 90 degrees—moved—to allow a subdivision of its original parcel c.1900.  The Nystrom family purchased the house in 1944.

References 

Houses on the National Register of Historic Places in Nevada
Gothic Revival architecture in Nevada
Houses completed in 1875
National Register of Historic Places in Reno, Nevada
Houses in Reno, Nevada